Lee Tae-min (born June 20, 1994), known professionally as Mushvenom (stylized in all caps), is a South Korean rapper. He is known for his humorous lyrics and using the Chungcheong dialect in his rap.

Mushvenom first garnered attention when he appeared on Show Me the Money 8 in 2019. His debut single, "Why Are You So Noisy", was met with critical acclaim. In 2020, he appeared on Show Me the Money 9 and finished in second place. "VVS", a single he released on the show, peaked at number one on the Gaon Digital Chart and won Hip-hop Track of the Year at the Korean Hip-hop Awards.

Early life and education 
Lee Tae-min was born on June 20, 1994, in Daedeok, Daejeon. He began rapping as a hobby when he was in the second year of high school. He graduated from Kukje University of Arts with an associate degree in applied music.

He adopted the stage name "Mushvenom" as it sounds similar to "cool guy" in Korean.

Career

2019: Show Me the Money 8 and "Why Are You So Noisy" 
In July 2019, Mushvenom appeared on Show Me the Money 8 where he first garnered attention. He was eliminated in round six (producer crew battle). In September 2019, he released his debut single "Why Are You So Noisy", which was nominated for Best Rap Song at the Korean Music Awards and Hip-hop Track of the Year at the Korean Hip-hop Awards. In November 2019, he released the single "Let Me Know", which was ranked in sixth place in Music Y'''s 2019 Single of the Year list. In December 2019, he released the single "Nice Head", which was nominated for Best Rap Song at the Korean Music Awards.

 2020: Show Me the Money 9 and "VVS" 
In October 2020, Mushvenom appeared on Show Me the Money 9 where he released "VVS" with Mirani, Munchman, and Khundi Panda. It became his most successful single, charting at number 1 on the Gaon Digital Chart for seven consecutive weeks and winning Hip-Hop Track of the Year at the Korean Hip-hop Awards. He also released singles "Tricker", "Godok", "Go", and "The Beauty of Void" on the show and finished in second place. He was ranked in second place in Music Y's 2020 Rookie of the Year list.

 Artistry 
Mushvenom is known for his "humorous lyrics, witty rhymes, and ear-catching Chungcheong accent". In an interview with Inven'', he cited his family as his biggest influence. He also gets inspiration from dramas such as Taejo Wang Geon, movies, and comedy shows.

Discography

Singles

Filmography

TV

Awards and nominations

References

External link 

 

1994 births
Living people
People from Daejeon
Show Me the Money (South Korean TV series) contestants
South Korean male rappers